During the 1999–2000 English football season, their 77th in the English Football League, Crewe Alexandra F.C. competed in the Football League First Division where they finished in 19th position on 51 points.

Final league table

Results
Crewe Alexandra's score comes first

Legend

Football League Division One

League Cup

FA Cup

Squad
Appearances for competitive matches only

References

Crewe Alexandra 1999–2000 at soccerbase.com (use drop down list to select relevant season)

See also
1999–2000 in English football

Crewe Alexandra F.C. seasons
Crewe Alexandra